Briggs Reservoir is a  reservoir in Plymouth, Massachusetts located in Billington Sea village south of that pond. The reservoir suffers from shoreline erosion and the water quality is impaired due to non-native aquatic plants in the reservoir.

There is another Briggs Reservoir located within Plymouth's boundaries in the Manomet section of town.

External links
Environmental Protection Agency
South Shore Coastal Watersheds - Lake Assessments

Lakes of Plymouth, Massachusetts